Sacralization or sacralisation may refer to:
 Sanctification, the act or process of acquiring sanctity in a religious context
 Sacralization, a social or political phenomenon; see political religion
 Sacralization of the fifth lumbar vertebra, a congenital vertebral anomaly

See also
 Sacralism, the confluence of church and state wherein one is called upon to change the other
 Sacral (disambiguation)